Upper Greenock railway station was a railway station serving the town of Greenock, Inverclyde, Scotland, originally as part of the Greenock and Wemyss Bay Railway and later owned by the Caledonian Railway.

History 
The station opened on 15 May 1865 and closed permanently on 5 June 1967. The station was directly replaced by Branchton station, approximately 2.8 km west.

Gallery

References

Notes

Sources 
 
 
 

Disused railway stations in Greenock
Former Caledonian Railway stations
Railway stations in Great Britain opened in 1865
Railway stations in Great Britain closed in 1967